Saranza (also Romanized as Sarānzā and Sarānzhā; also known as Sar Nezā‘) is a village in Poshtkuh Rural District, in the Central District of Firuzkuh County, Tehran Province, Iran. At the 2006 census, its population was 333, in 93 families.

References 

Populated places in Firuzkuh County